Arthur Edmond Harrison  (6 May 1891 – 9 July 1965) was an Australian rules footballer who played for the Carlton Football Club in the Victorian Football League (VFL).

References

External links
	
	
Arthur Harrison's profile at Blueseum

Australian rules footballers from Victoria (Australia)
Carlton Football Club players
1891 births
1965 deaths